Sand collars are the characteristic egg masses of one family of sea snails, the moon snails, marine gastropod mollusks in the family Naticidae. These egg masses are often found washed up either whole, or sometimes in fragments, on sandy beaches where moon snails are living, either intertidally or subtidally.

Description
When they are intact, sand collars are shaped rather like an old-fashioned detachable shirt or blouse collar (hence the name). The sand collar consists of sand grains cemented together by a gelatinous matrix, with the embedded eggs contained within the matrix. The collar is laid by the female moon snail, and the size of the sand collar gives an indication of the size of the adult female moon snail that laid it; larger species of moon snail lay larger sand collars.

A fresh sand collar feels stiff and yet flexible, as if it were made out of plastic. Each sand collar contains thousands of capsules, each one housing one or several live embryos. In species with planktonic development, these embryos hatch out as bilobed veligers. After the eggs hatch, the sand collar disintegrates.

References
 Bandel, K. (1999) On the origin of the carnivorous gastropod group Naticoidea (Mollusca) in the Cretaceous with description of some convergent but unrelated groups. Greifswalder Geowissenschaftliche Beiträge, 6, 134-175.
 Huelsken T. et al. (2008) The Naticidae (Mollusca: Gastropoda) of Isola del Giglio (Tuscany, Italy): Shell characters, live animals, and a molecular analysis of egg masses. Zootaxa, 1770, 1-40.

Naticidae